Nesoryzomys narboroughi is a  rodent in the genus Nesoryzomys from Fernandina Island in the Galápagos Islands.

Taxonomy
Nesoryzomys indefessus, a related extinct species, was found on Indefatigable Island. Some consider the two to be subspecies of one species, in which the Fernandina form would be Nesoryzomys indefessus narboroughi; however, N. narboroughi is now considered distinct.

Conservation
Due to Fernandina Island's small size, as well as vulnerability to invasive species, N. narborughi was rated by the IUCN Red List as a Vulnerable species.

References

Literature cited 
Musser, G.G. and Carleton, M.D. 2005. Superfamily Muroidea. Pp. 894–1531 in Wilson, D.E. and Reeder, D.M. (eds.). Mammal Species of the World: a taxonomic and geographic reference. 3rd ed. Baltimore: The Johns Hopkins University Press, 2 vols., 2142 pp. 

Endemic fauna of the Galápagos Islands
Nesoryzomys
Taxonomy articles created by Polbot